Baghin (which can be Romanized as Bāghīn; also known as Bagin and Gachin. is a city in the Central District of Kerman County, Kerman Province, Iran.  At the 2006 census, its population was 7,616, in 1,903 families.

References

Populated places in Kerman County
Cities in Kerman Province